Nicholas David Capon Tee (born third quarter of 1949 in Pontypridd), an alumnus of Balliol College, Oxford, is a retired British international rower.

Rowing career
Tee participated in the 1974 World Rowing Championships in Lucerne, competing in the lightweight coxless four event. The crew selected from the Leander Club finished in seventh place overall after winning the B final.

He competed in four Boat Races for Oxford, and was a member of the winning crew in the 1974 rowing in the bow position. In 1975 as part of the lightweight four with Graeme Hall, Christopher Drury and Daniel Topolski they won a silver medal for Great Britain at the 1975 World Rowing Championships in Nottingham.

References

Living people
1949 births
Oxford University Boat Club rowers
British male rowers
World Rowing Championships medalists for Great Britain